Hoal is a village located near Khanna in Ludhiana district of the Indian state of Punjab. Dr Balpreet Randhawa also belong to village Hoal. She is state topper and won many national and international awards.

References

  
Villages in Ludhiana district